Bujagali Energy Limited (BEL), is an electric energy generating company in Uganda. The company owns and operates the Bujagali Power Station, which was the largest hydropower plant in the country as of July 2014.

Overview
BEL is a single purpose company, formed to develop the 250 megawatt Bujagali Hydropower Station. Under arrangements with the government of Uganda (GOU), BEL owns and operates the power plant for 30 years, starting with commissioning. After the 30 years, BEL will transfer ownership of the station to the GOU for US$1.00. The power generated is sold to the Uganda Electricity Transmission Company Limited, the Uganda electricity transmitter monopoly. The power purchase agreements were executed between the concerned parties, in December 2005.

Power stations
BEL owns and operates the Bujagali Hydroelectric Power Station, a 250 megawatt hydropower station built on the Victoria Nile at a cost of US$900 million between 2007 and 2012.

Ownership
As of September 2016, the shareholders in BEL were as listed in the table below. In May 2018, the Daily Nation newspaper reported that Jubilee Holdings Limited was set to invest an additional KSh4.4 billion (US$44 million) the business, in addition to the KSh5.5 billion (US$55 million) that it had already invested. In August 2018, Sithe Global Power of the United States, exited the company and SN Power AS, of Norway acquired shareholding in the business. After the exit of Sithe Global Power in 2018, the shareholding was adjusted as reflected in the table below. SN Power AS was acquired by Scatec along with its assets on 29 January 2021.

Financing
The following entities contributed funds to build the power station. As of July 2019, the restructured debt package was approximately US$500 million, with IFC contributing about US$100 million to the total new loan package.

In December 2017, the Ugandan government reached consensus with the power station's financiers on restructuring the loans and waiving taxes on the power generated, to enable the cost of power to the consumer to reduce. In July 2018, with about US$450 million of the US$900 million construction loan repaid, the remaining loan was restructured and extended for another 15 years, thereby lowering the loan payments and related electricity tariffs to as low as US$0.08 per unit, for large industrial customers. The new lower electricity rates were expected to commence in July 2018.

See also

 Electricity Regulatory Authority
 West Nile Rural Electrification Company
 Kiira Power Station
 Nalubaale Power Station

References

External links
Webpage of the Electricity Regulatory Authority

Energy companies of Uganda
Hydroelectric power companies of Uganda
Aga Khan Development Network
Energy companies established in 2004
Renewable resource companies established in 2004
2004 establishments in Uganda
Electric power companies of Uganda